Jeremiah Benettis (died 1774) was an Italian writer and Friar Minor Capuchin.

He belonged to the Province of Piedmont in Italy, and wrote two valuable historical treatises. The first, titled Chronica et critics historiæ sacrae et profanæ, deals with various astronomical questions and the religious rites and ceremonies of ancient peoples, and was written with a view to facilitate the study of Sacred Scripture. In the second work, titled Privilegiorum S. Petri vindicia, he gives a history of the primacy of the Roman Pontiff.

References

Capuchins
1774 deaths
Clergy from Piedmont
Italian religious writers
Year of birth missing
Writers from Piedmont